La Pícara Soñadora (English title: The Mischievous Dreamer) is a Mexican telenovela produced by Valentín Pimstein for Televisa in 1991. Based on a La Pícara soñadora, a 1956 Argentine film of the same name, directed by Ernesto Arancibia. It starred by Mariana Levy, Eduardo Palomo, Rafael Inclán, Irán Eory, Gabriela Goldsmith and Laura Flores.

Plot 
Lupita is young and pretty and studies law. Although her future seems bright, for the moment she is penniless and that's why she lives in the Sares Rochild department store, where she works by day as a salesgirl in the toy department and her uncle works by night as the security guard.

Everything she "borrows" from the store to live on, she writes down in a little book so that she can repay it when she finishes her studies. She has it all planned. But one day, she meets a guy outside the office of the owner of the department store. She thinks he is there to apply for a job, and Alfredo decides to play along.

Although the owner is his father, he uses the name of his best friend, pretends to be poor and arranges for himself to get a job there in order to chase that cute Lupita. Alfredo has always been a lazy bum and a flirt, and to him, this is all a game. But soon the game turns serious when he realizes that he's falling in love with her and the secrets they both keep are standing in the way.

Cast 
 
 Mariana Levy as Lupita López
 Eduardo Palomo as Alfredo Rochild/Carlos Pérez
 Rafael Inclán as Camilo López
 Irán Eory as Doña Marcelina Ruvalcaba Vda. de Rochild
 Gabriela Goldsmith as Gladys de Rochild
 Laura Flores as Monica Rochild #1
 Lola Merino as Monica Rochild #2
 Angélica Rivera as Giovanna Carini
 Antonio De Carlo as Santiago Garrido
 Roberto Vander as Gregorio Rochild
 Elizabeth Aguilar as Lucía
 Roberto Ballesteros as Adolfo Molina
 Ricardo Cortez as Pietro Carini
 Claudia Ramírez as Rosa Fernández Vda. de García
 Fernando Ciangherotti as Federico Rochild
 Alfredo Alegría as Detective Benitez
 Alejandro Aragón as Osvaldo Frías
 Alexis Ayala as Carlos Pérez
 Karen Senties as Laura Sánchez
 Adrian Ramos as Detective Tellez
 Odiseo Bichir as Ignacio Martínez
 Roberto Huicoechea as Detective Colin
 Angélica Arvizu as Delfina
 Beatriz Ornelas as Dora
 Dacia Arcaráz as Susana
 Silvia Campos as Barbara
 Dina de Marco as Doña Bertha
 Claudio Báez as Jaime Pérez
 Gerardo Gonzalez as Gomez
 Bertha del Castillo as Angela
 Diana Golden as Elvira Funes
 Nicky Mondellini as Gina Valdez
 Roberto Mateos as Florencio
 Irlanda Mora as Leonor de Carini
 Armando Palomo as José Zamora
 Jorge Pascual Rubio as Domingo
 Roxana Saucedo as Olivia
 Luis Guillermo Martell as Julio "Pollito" Zamora
 Marisol Centeno as Agustina "Nena" Martínez
 Ella Laboriel as Toña
 Claudia Ortega as Agustina
 Juan Carlos Casasola as Fausto Medrano
 Rafael del Villar as Lic. Argueyo
 Frances Ondiviela as Detective Altavaz
 David Ostrosky as Claudio Rendón
 Daniel Serrano as Raúl Sergio Sendel as Hugo René Muñoz as Dr. Lozano''
 Anahí
 Mónika Sánchez
 Ariel López Padilla
 Rebeca Manríquez
 Rafael Velasco
 Itatí Cantoral
 Eva Garbo
 Sussan Taunton
 Nubia Marti
 Roberto Blandón
 Sara Montes
 Ricardo Vera

Awards and nominations

References

External links 

1991 telenovelas
Mexican telenovelas
1991 Mexican television series debuts
1991 Mexican television series endings
Spanish-language telenovelas
Television shows set in Mexico City
Televisa telenovelas